The 1923 Georgia Bulldogs football team represented the Georgia Bulldogs of the University of Georgia during the 1923 college football season; the 30th season of football played at Georgia since the football program started in 1892 (no football was played in 1917 or 1918 during World War I). Led by first-year head coach and former player George Cecil Woodruff, the Bulldogs completed the season with a 5–3–1 record.  One of the assistant coaches was Harry Mehre, who was to succeed Woodruff as head coach in 1928.  Bulldogs tackle and captain Joe Bennett was named an All-American for the second year in 1923, becoming the first two-time All-American in Georgia Bulldogs football history.

Schedule

References

Georgia
Georgia Bulldogs football seasons
Georgia Bulldogs football